Four Winds is the sixth studio album by the rock band The Lightning Seeds. It was released in 2009 through Universal. The record is the band's first album of new tracks since 1999. The first single, "Ghosts", was released on 11 May 2009.

Track listing
All tracks written by Ian Broudie (except where stated).
 "4 Winds" – 5:02
 "Things Just Happened" – 3:18
 "Ghosts" (Broudie, James Skelly) – 3:09
 "Said and Done" – 3:28
 "Don't Walk On By" – 3:46
 "The Story Goes" (Broudie, J. Mullen) – 3:03
 "On a Day Like This" (Broudie, Skelly) – 3:15
 "All I Do" – 3:46
 "I'll Be Around" – 2:35
 "I Still Feel the Same" (Broudie, Matt Cullen) – 3:00

Personnel
The Lightning Seeds
 Ian Broudie – vocals, guitar, producer

Production
 Simon Rogers – string and woodwind arrangements
 Dave Bascombe – mixing
 Stephen Harris – mixing

Additional musicians
 James Skelly – guitar
 Paul Duffy – guitar
 Nick Power – keyboards
 Lee Southall – bass
 Ian Skelly – drums
 Raife Burchell – drums
 Scott Marmion – backing vocals
 Sophie Paterson – backing vocals

Other personnel
 Pelle Crépin – photography

Charts

References

2009 albums
The Lightning Seeds albums
Albums produced by Ian Broudie